Dustin Robert "Dusty" Hughes (born June 29, 1982) is an American former professional baseball pitcher.

Career

Kansas City Royals
Hughes was drafted by the Kansas City Royals in the 1st round of the 2003 MLB Draft.
On September 6, 2009 Hughes made his Major League debut against the Los Angeles Angels. Hughes threw 4 innings in relief, allowing just one hit and struck out five batters.

Minnesota Twins
On January 26, 2011, Hughes was claimed off waivers by the Minnesota Twins. He posted an ERA of 9.95 before being designated for assignment.

Atlanta Braves
After the season, he signed a minor league contract with the Atlanta Braves.

References

External links

1982 births
Living people
Major League Baseball pitchers
Baseball players from Mississippi
Delta State Statesmen baseball players
Kansas City Royals players
Minnesota Twins players
Arizona League Royals players
Burlington Bees players
Wilmington Blue Rocks players
High Desert Mavericks players
Wichita Wranglers players
Northwest Arkansas Naturals players
Omaha Royals players
Rochester Red Wings players
Gwinnett Braves players
Sportspeople from Tupelo, Mississippi